Wabash National is an American diversified industrial manufacturing company and North America's largest producer of semi trailers and liquid transportation systems. The company specializes in the design and production of dry freight vans, refrigerated vans, platform trailers, liquid tank trailers, intermodal equipment, engineered products and composite products. Its products are sold under the following brand names: Wabash National, Transcraft, Benson, DuraPlate, Walker Transport, Walker Defense Group, Walker Barrier Systems, Walker Engineered Products, Brenner Tank, Beall, Garsite, Progress Tank, TST, Bulk Tank International and Extract Technology. The company operates a number of Wabash National Trailer Centers, trailer service centers and retail distributors of new and used trailers and aftermarket parts throughout the United States. In 2017, the total revenue was 1.77 billion USD.

History
Wabash National was founded as a start-up in 1985 in Lafayette, Indiana and has been publicly traded since 1991. The company was co-founded in April 1985 by Jerry Ehrlich, formerly the president of Monon Corp., an Indiana-based trailer manufacturer. Two years earlier, corporate raider Victor Posner had acquired Monon's parent company, Evans Products Co., and had proceeded to sell off its assets to pay debt. As Monon declined, Ehrlich repeatedly offered to buy the company but to no avail. Thus, Ehrlich and two fellow ex-Monon Corp. executives, Ronald J. Klimara and William M. Hoover, started their own company. They were soon joined by 14 other former Monon employees.

Ehrlich and his associates established their company in Lafayette, Indiana, about 30 miles south of Monon Corp. and approximately 65 miles northwest of Indianapolis. In need of manufacturing facilities, Wabash initially leased a 450,000 square-foot abandoned factory then used by local farmers to store corn. The executives' experience and contacts helped Wabash acquire its start-up capital: $2 million in equity from Washington D.C. investors Steven and Mitchell Rales, a $3 million industrial revenue bond, and a $5 million line of credit from a local bank. Wabash's first trailer was reportedly built on two sawhorses and was finished in August 1985. Its first customer was Sears, Roebuck & Co., a former customer of Monon, which ordered ten trailers from Wabash.

With Ehrlich as Wabash's president, and Hoover and Klimara as vice-presidents of sales and finance, respectively, Wabash began to grow rapidly. Its client list soon expanded to include Heartland Express Inc., Schneider National Inc., and Dart Transit Co. 

In 1986, the company generated sales of $70 million from more than 15,000 trailers. That year the company also purchased a more suitable factory in the same area for about $2.5 million.

On May 8, 2012, Wabash National completed the acquisition of Walker Group Holdings for $376 million.

On September 27, 2017, Wabash National completed the acquisition of Supreme Industries, Inc.

Products
Wabash National's product lines include a variety of dry freight vans, refrigerated vans, converter dollies, platform trailers, liquid tank trailers, intermodal equipment, engineered products and composite products. They also make high-quality laminated oak flooring used extensively in dry van trailers, truck bodies, and containers.

Facilities
Wabash National is headquartered in Lafayette, Indiana, also the site of its main production facility. Additional manufacturing plants are located in Cadiz, Kentucky; Harrison, Arkansas; Kansas City, Kansas; Portland, Oregon; New Lisbon, Wisconsin; Fond du Lac, Wisconsin; and San Jose Iturbide, Guanajuato, Mexico. After the investment of a manufacturing facility in Little Falls, Minnesota, Wabash National plans to "expand production operations for molded structural composites (MSC)."

The company operates a network of dealerships in North America called Wabash National Trailer Centers.

References

External links
Wabash National
Wabash National Corp EDGAR Filing History

Companies listed on the New York Stock Exchange
Manufacturing companies based in Indiana
Truck manufacturers of the United States